The 1966 United States Senate election in Arkansas took place on November 8, 1966. Incumbent U.S. Senator John L. McClellan was re-elected to a fifth term in office.

Because the Republican Party (or any other party) did not field a candidate in the general election, McClellan's primary victory was tantamount to election.

Democratic primary

Candidates
Foster Johnson, Little Rock book salesman
John L. McClellan, incumbent Senator

Campaign
For the first time since 1954, Senator John McClellan faced a challenger for the Democratic nomination, Foster Johnson, a 51-year old book salesman and political neophyte. McClellan did not stage a formal campaign for re-election and ignored his opponent. Johnson did win the support of organized labor in the state but attracted little attention to his campaign otherwise.

Results

General election
McClellan was unopposed in the general election. At this time, Arkansas law did not require tabulation of votes for unopposed candidates.

See also
1966 United States Senate elections

References 

Single-candidate elections
1966
Arkansas
United States Senate